"Polly Wolly Doodle" is a traditional American children's song. It was sung by Dan Emmett's Virginia Minstrels, who premiered at New York's Bowery Amphitheatre in February 1843, and is often credited to Emmett (1815–1904).

It was known to have been performed by the Yale Glee Club in 1878, and was first published in a Harvard student songbook in 1880.

"Polly Wolly Doodle" appears in the manuscript for Laura Ingalls Wilder's novel, These Happy Golden Years (1943), exactly as it is used in the published version.

The melody of the song, as it is usually sung, formed the basis for Boney M.'s hit "Hooray! Hooray! It's a Holi-Holiday" in 1979, and for Alexandra Burke's song "Start Without You". The tune is also found in children's music, including the Sunday school song "O-B-E-D-I-E-N-C-E", "Radio Lollipop" by the German group die Lollipops, and the Barney & Friends songs "Alphabet Soup" (using only the tune of the first verse) and "If I Had One Wish" (which uses both verses).

Notable recordings 

 1917: Harry C. Browne
 1926: Gid Tanner and the Skillet Lickers (as "Polly Wolly Doo").
 1939: Carter Family (as "Polly Wolly Doodle All Day")
 1940: Shirley Temple
 1961: Bing Crosby included the song in a medley on his album 101 Gang Songs.
 1962: Alvin and the Chipmunks on their album The Chipmunk Songbook
 1964: Burl Ives
 1976: Leon Redbone on his album On the Track
 1979: Boney M. (as "Hooray! Hooray! It's a Holi-Holiday")
 1979: Baton Baton Mein (as "Uthe sabke Kadam" by Amit Kumar, Pearl, Rajesh Roshan and Yogesh)
 1982: Sandra Beech sings "Holi-Holiday" on her record, "Inch by Inch"
 1989: Wee Sing Fun 'n' Folk
 1991: The Singing Kettle (as "Mice on Ice" on their Christmas Cracker Show video; coincidentally two years later they recorded "Polly Wolly Doodle" with a different tune and set of lyrics for the Adventures in Kettleland video)
 2002: VeggieTales on their album on CD, Bob and Larry's Backyard Party
 2003: The Cheeky Girls (as "(Hooray, Hooray) It's A Cheeky Holiday")
 2009: Alexandra Burke (as "Start Without You")

Appearances in film and television 

 Shirley Temple sings "Polly Wolly Doodle" in the 1935 film The Littlest Rebel.
 The song is featured in two Frank Capra films: You Can't Take It with You (1938) and Pocketful of Miracles (1961).
 The song is the theme of the 1938 Donald Duck short film Good Scouts, in which it is played over the opening credits and sung by Donald and his nephews on their march.
 Clark Gable sings the song while wildcatting in the 1940 film Boomtown.
 Woody Woodpecker sings the song while driving his car in the opening scene of the 1947 short film Well Oiled.
 Character actor Frank Puglia sings the song continually (and eventually gets the whole Anderson family to sing along) in the first episode of season three of the TV show Father Knows Best.  This episode originally aired 12 September 1956.
 The song appears at the 2:19 mark of Sam Peckinpah's 1969 The Wild Bunch, sung by Strother Martin's character, Coffer.
 Julie Andrews sings the song in the opening faux-musical set piece of S.O.B (1981) and the tune is heard several times throughout the film.
 Robert Culp sings "Polly Wolly Doodle" in The Greatest American Hero - Season 3, Episode 4 (1982) - The Resurrection of Carlini
 The Kidsongs kids sing the song in the 1987 video "A Day at the Circus".
 The Juke Box Puppet Band performs the piece in an episode of Shining Time Station
 Kimmy Gibbler (Andrea Barber) sings the song in a 1991 episode of Full House.
 Mr. Hollywood sings the song constantly in episodes of 2 Stupid Dogs.
 In the Freakazoid Episode, Island of Dr. Mystico, The villains sing the song, poorly, in the plane scene. 
 In the video games Pokémon Red, Green, Blue, and Yellow, as well as the Pokémon: Indigo League anime, the composition "Road to Viridian City Leaving Pallet Town" sounds similar to "Polly Wolly Doodle".
 The song is played in a get-well card in the Monk season 4 episode "Monk Stays in Bed" (2005).
 In the Even Stevens episode, “Little Mr. Sacktown”, Beans armpit farts to the tune of “Polly Wolly Doodle".
 In the video game Red Dead Redemption 2, NPC's can occasionally be heard playing the song on a banjo.

References 

American folk songs
Blackface minstrel songs
1880 songs
American children's songs
Traditional children's songs
Songs about Louisiana
Shirley Temple songs
Bing Crosby songs
Alvin and the Chipmunks songs